Fyzabad is a town in southwestern Trinidad,  south of San Fernando, west of Siparia and northeast of Point Fortin.  It is named after the town of Faizabad in India.  Colloquially it is known as "Fyzo" by many people.

History

Fyzabad was founded by Rev. Kenneth J. Grant, a Presbyterian missionary in Trinidad in 1871.  The purpose of the settlement was to separate Christian Indians from the unconverted Hindu and Muslim populations.  The town later grew with the discovery of oil in the area in 1917, and attracted a large number of immigrants from Grenada and other Lesser Antillean islands.  In 1937 Fyzabad was the centre of labour unrest, led by T.U.B. Butler which is considered the birth of the Labour movement in Trinidad and Tobago.

The collapse of oil prices in the 1980s, coupled with declining onshore oil production, led to a decline in the town of Fyzabad.

Notable persons
 Tubal Uriah Butler, preacher and union leader
 Anthony Carmona, fifth President of Trinidad and Tobago
 Michael Fisher, physicist
 Billy Ocean,  British R&B and pop singer, born Leslie Charles
 Lennox Superville (born 1942), Trinidadian-American professor, mathematician, and engineer

References 

Populated places in Trinidad and Tobago
Populated places established in 1871
1871 establishments in North America
1871 establishments in the British Empire